The 2006 Wyoming gubernatorial election took place on November 7, 2006. Incumbent Democratic Governor Dave Freudenthal won re-election in a landslide over Republican Ray Hunkins, becoming the first Democrat since 1910 to win every county in the state. , this was the last time a Democrat was elected to statewide office in Wyoming, the last time a Democrat carried every county in the state, the last gubernatorial election in which a Democrat received more than 30% of the vote, and the last statewide election in which a Democrat received more than 45% of the vote.

Democratic primary

Candidates
Dave Freudenthal, incumbent Governor of Wyoming
Al Hamburg, perennial candidate

Results

Republican primary

Candidates
Ray Hunkins, attorney and rancher
John H. Self

Results

General election

Predictions

Polling

Results

See also
 2006 United States gubernatorial elections
 2006 United States Senate election in Wyoming

References

Official campaign websites 
 Dave Freudenthal (D) for Governor
 Ray Hunkins (R) for Governor

2006
Gubernatorial
2006 United States gubernatorial elections